Baden is an unincorporated area and census-designated place in southeastern Prince George's County, Maryland, United States. As of the 2020 census, the CDP had a population of 2,114.

Geography

Baden is bordered to the south by Aquasco, to the southwest by Charles County, to the west by Cedarville, to the north by Croom, and to the east by Brandywine.

Demographics

2020 census

Note: the US Census treats Hispanic/Latino as an ethnic category. This table excludes Latinos from the racial categories and assigns them to a separate category. Hispanics/Latinos can be of any race.

Education
Baden residents are assigned to schools in Prince George's County Public Schools. Residential areas of the CDP area are zoned to Baden Elementary School, Gwynn Park Middle School, and Gwynn Park High School.

Prince George's County Memorial Library System operates the Baden Library.

Notable people 
Alethia Tanner grew up on the plantation of Rachel Pratt, the mother of Maryland governor Thomas Pratt on the west side of the Patuxent River opposite Lower Marlboro.

References

Census-designated places in Maryland
Census-designated places in Prince George's County, Maryland